Barbonville is a commune in the Meurthe-et-Moselle department in northeastern France. It is part of the community of communes of Val de Meurthe.

The parish church is dedicated to Saint-Remy.

The main local business is the tree nursery Pepinieres Koenig, founded in 1929.

Population

See also
Communes of the Meurthe-et-Moselle department

References

Communes of Meurthe-et-Moselle